School paste is  paste used in schools for art and crafts.

Generally it is a non-toxic starch-based paste such as wheatpaste also called flour and water paste, although PVA glues are also often used.

Well-known brands include:

Australia
 Perkins Paste
 Clag (glue)

United States
 Elmer's glue

Adhesives